The Ozell Tapes is a 2002 album by Marcus Miller. The first edition of the album was sold on tour dates on Marcus' own label.

Track listing 
All tracks composed by Marcus Miller except where noted.

Disc 1
 "Intro" (Big Doug Epting)
 "Power"
 "So What" (Miles Davis)
 "Lonnie's Lament" (John Coltrane)
 "Cousin John"
 "Scoop"
 "I Loves You Porgy" (George Gershwin, Ira Gershwin, DuBose Heyward)
 "Panther"

Disc 2
 "3 Deuces"
 "Your Amazing Grace"
 "Nikki's Groove"
 "When Your Life Was Low" (Joe Sample, Will Jennings)
 "Burning Down the House" (David Byrne, Jerry Harrison, Chris Frantz, Tina Weymouth)
 "People Make The World Go 'Round" (Thom Bell, Linda Creed)
 "Killing Me Softly" (Charles Fox, Norman Gimbel)
 "Miles/Marcus Medley: Hannibal/Amandla/Tutu" (Amandla Poets)

Personnel
 Marcus Miller – Bass, Bass Clarinet, Soprano Saxophone, Keyboards
 Poogie Bell – Drums
 Dean Brown – Guitars
 Roger Byam – Tenor And Soprano Saxophone, Flute
 Bruce Flowers – Keyboards
 Lalah Hathaway – Vocals
 Michael "Patches" Stewart – Trumpet
 Leroy Taylor – Keyboards

External links

Marcus Miller albums
2002 albums
Albums produced by Marcus Miller